Yatesboro is an unincorporated community located in Cowanshannock Township, Armstrong County, Pennsylvania, United States. Yatesboro has a post office with ZIP code 16263.

The elevation is 1,132 feet. Yatesboro appears on the Rural Valley U.S. Geological Survey Map. Armstrong County is in the Eastern Time Zone (UTC -5 hours).

History
Yatesboro was founded as a company town circa 1900, and built on farmland by the Rochester and Pittsburgh Coal and Iron Company. It was one of 17 company towns sold in 1947: McIntyre, Coal Run, Iselin, Waterman, Lucernemines, Aultman, Ernest, Tidesdale, Coy, Luciusboro, Fulton Run, Nu Mines, Yatesboro, Margaret, Helvetia, Twin Rocks, and Yatesboro Lots.

References

Unincorporated communities in Pennsylvania
Unincorporated communities in Armstrong County, Pennsylvania